A. Chatterjee (born 22 June 1966) is an Indian former cricketer. He played one first-class match for Hyderabad in 1984/85.

See also
 List of Hyderabad cricketers

References

External links
 

1966 births
Living people
Indian cricketers
Hyderabad cricketers
Cricketers from Kolkata